Cambodia participated in the 2007 Southeast Asian Games held in the city of Nakhon Ratchasima, Thailand from December 6, 2007 to December 16, 2007.

Participation details
Rank No. 9 (2007)

Medal Tally
Gold=2
Silver=5
Bronze=12
Total=19

References

2007 in Cambodian sport
2007
Nations at the 2007 Southeast Asian Games